Jan Allan Müller (born 25 July 1969) is a retired Faroese football striker.

Club career
He grew up in Vágur, where he played football for VB Vágur (now called FC Suðuroy). In October 1990 he had a trial at Dutch club Go Ahead Eagles earning him a first professional contract. Later Müller moved to Denmark to play professional football, he played for the Danish clubs AC Horsens, Esbjerg fB and Svendborg fB. He had to retire early from professional football due to injuries.

International career
He was a member of the Faroe Islands national football team from 1988 to 1998. He played 34 matches, scoring 4 goals and has represented his country in 13 FIFA World Cup qualification matches.

International goals
Scores and results list Faroe Islands' goal tally first.

References

External links

1969 births
Living people
Faroese footballers
Faroe Islands international footballers
Go Ahead Eagles players
SfB-Oure FA players
Faroese expatriate footballers
Expatriate footballers in the Netherlands
Association football forwards